"Dance with Me" is the third and final single released from 112's 2001 album, Part III. It features Slim on lead vocals. The released version features rap artist Beanie Sigel and is featured on the Bad Boy album We Invented the Remix. The song peaked at number 39 on the US Billboard Hot 100 and became a platinum-selling hit in Australia and Belgium in 2002, reaching number two in Australia, number one in Flanders, and number nine in Wallonia.

Track listings
US 12-inch single
A1. "Dance with Me" (extended version) – 4:27
A2. "Dance with Me" (instrumental) – 4:27
B1. "Dance with Me" (radio edit) – 4:00
B2. "Dance with Me" (acappella) – 4:25

European CD single
 "Dance with Me" (radio edit) – 3:17
 "Dance with Me" (album version) – 4:01

Australian CD single
 "Dance with Me" (radio edit) – 3:17
 "Dance with Me" (album version) – 4:01
 "Dance with Me" (remix radio mix featuring Beanie Sigel) – 4:03
 "Dance with Me" (remix club mix featuring Beanie Sigel) – 5:00

Charts

Weekly charts

Year-end charts

Certifications

Release history

Cover versions
 Saint featuring M.D.P. released a cover of "Dance with Me" in 2007. A remix of Saint's version, by the DJ duo Houseshaker, was a club hit in Brazil in 2008.
 Lexington Bridge released a cover in 2008.
 In June 2022, English band Blue released their cover as the second single from their album Heart and Soul.

References

External links
Music video on ArtistDirect.com

2000 songs
2001 singles
112 (band) songs
Bad Boy Records singles
Beanie Sigel songs
Bertelsmann Music Group singles
Songs written by Daron Jones
Songs written by Poo Bear
Songs written by Quinnes Parker
Songs written by Slim (singer)
Ultratop 50 Singles (Flanders) number-one singles